Wreck Lead was a train station along the Long Beach Branch of the Long Island Rail Road. The station was opened in June 1888 by the New York and Long Beach Railroad to serve numerous fishing clubs and hotels. This station was a flag stop. Wreck Lead consisted of a low cinder platform on the northeast side of the Reynolds Channel (south of here, the railroad traverses the channel via the Wreck Lead Bridge). In 1911, a second platform was installed on the west side of the tracks and on January 15, 1927, and Wreck Lead became the terminus of the double-tracking of the Long Beach Branch. Wreck Lead closed on December 31, 1927.

See also
Long Beach Branch

References

External links
Odd Interlude at Wreck Lead (Sam Berlinner III's Long Island Rail Road site)
Long Beach LIRR Station, including Reynolds Channel and Wreck Lead Station (TrainsAreFun)

Former Long Island Rail Road stations in Nassau County, New York
Railway stations in the United States opened in 1888
Railway stations closed in 1927